The Paradise Suite can refer to:

 The Paradise Suite (Armchair Theatre), an episode of the TV series Armchair Theatre
 The Paradise Suite (film), a 2015 Dutch film